Jinkee may refer to:

Jinkee Pacquiao (born 1979), Filipina politician
Gibb, Livingston & Co., a trading firm known in Chinese as Jinkee